Albert Jurardus van Prooijen (7 September 1834, Groningen - 31 October 1898, Amsterdam) was a Dutch painter of cityscapes, landscapes (often with animals) and genre scenes.

Biography 
His father was the decorative painter Johannes van Prooijen (1801-1871). After graduating, he worked at his father's business.

Soon, however, he began participating in local exhibitions and, in 1853, was awarded the "Grote Koninklijke Medaille" for painting. Three years later, he provided a series of cityscape drawings for the lithographer, who published them as the Album der stad Groningen.

From 1864 to 1865, he temporarily served as Headmaster of the Academie Minerva, following the resignation of Johannes Hinderikus Egenberger, who later had a change of mind and returned. According to Franciscus Hermanus Bach, a friend of Egenberger's, Prooijen didn't receive a permanent position as a teacher because he had a drinking problem.
[[File:Groene Weeshuis Groningen.jpg|thumb|345px|The  (1858)]]
He was married in 1868, to a woman twelve years his junior. The following year, he and his family (which would eventually number seven children) settled in Amsterdam, where he switched from cityscapes to landscapes and river views.

He had an uneventful career, and died there at the age of sixty-four. In 1997, anticipating the 100th anniversary of his death, a major retrospective was held at the Fraeylemaborg in Slochteren.

References

 Further reading 
 E. Roem, Albert Jurardus van Prooijen (1834-1898). Stadsgezichten, landschappen en zeegezichten'' (exhibition catalog), Stichting Fraeylemaborg, 1997

External links

ArtNet: More works by Van Prooijen.

1834 births
1898 deaths
19th-century Dutch painters
Dutch male painters
Cityscape artists
Dutch landscape painters
Dutch genre painters
Painters from Groningen
19th-century Dutch male artists